Rampasha is a Union Council of Bishwanath Upazila of Sylhet District in north-east Bangladesh. The Union Council office of Rampasha is situated in the east side of the village. Rampasha is famous for being the ancestral home of Dewan Ali Raja, a zamidar and  father of Hason Raja, a prominent Bengali poet.

Notable people
 Hason Raja, mystic poet, musician, philosopher

References

Unions of Bishwanath Upazila